Antonio Molina Canet (born 4 January 1991) is a Spanish former professional racing cyclist, who competed professionally for the  team from 2014 to 2019. In August 2018, he was named in the startlist for the Vuelta a España.

Major results
2013
9th Overall Vuelta a la Comunidad de Madrid Under-23
2016
 1st  Intermediate sprints classification Giro del Trentino
2017
 5th Overall Tour du Gévaudan Languedoc-Roussillon
2018
 6th Overall Route d'Occitanie

Grand Tour general classification results timeline

References

External links
 

1991 births
Living people
Spanish male cyclists
People from Xàbia
Sportspeople from the Province of Alicante
Cyclists from the Valencian Community